Indian Relocation Act may refer to:

 the Indian Removal Act of 1830.
 the Indian Relocation Act of 1956 (Public Law 959).